The Anhui musk deer (Moschus anhuiensis) is an endangered species of musk deer that is endemic to the Dabie Mountains of western Anhui province, China. It was formerly described as a subspecies of Moschus berezovskii and Moschus moschiferus, but is now classified as a separate species.

See also
List of endangered and protected species of China

References

Notes

Mammals described in 1982
Musk deer
Endangered Fauna of China